Cushing Independent School District is a public school district based in Cushing, Texas (USA).

The district is located in northwestern Nacogdoches County and extends into a southwestern Rusk County.

Cushing ISD has two campuses - Cushing School (Grades 7-12) and Cushing Elementary (Grades PK-6).

In 2009, the school district was rated "recognized" by the Texas Education Agency.

Cushing has the distinction of having the longest active playoff drought in 2a football.

References

External links
Cushing ISD

School districts in Nacogdoches County, Texas
School districts in Rusk County, Texas